Rubén Darío Gómez  (3 March 1940 – 23 July 2010) was a Colombian road racing cyclist. He won the two most important stage races in Colombia, the Vuelta a Colombia and the Clásico RCN two times. He also competed at the 1960 Summer Olympics and the 1964 Summer Olympics.

Major results

1957
 1st Stage 10 Vuelta a Colombia
1958
 1st Stage 12 Vuelta a Colombia
1959
 1st  Overall Vuelta a Colombia
1st Stages 2, 8, 12 & 14
1960
 1st Stages 13 & 15 Vuelta a Colombia
 2nd Overall Vuelta a Mexico
1961
 1st  Overall Vuelta a Colombia
1st Stages 2 & 7
 1st  Overall Clásico RCN
1st Mountains classification
1st Stage 1
1962
 1st  Overall Clásico RCN
1st Stage 1
 1st Stage 14 Vuelta a Colombia
 Central American and Caribbean Games
2nd  Team time trial
3rd  Road race
1963
 2nd Overall Vuelta a Colombia
1st Stages 1 & 10
1964
 1st  Overall Vuelta a Guatemala
1st Mountains classification
 2nd Overall Vuelta a Colombia
1st Stage 5
 3rd Overall Vuelta a Mexico
1st Mountains classification
1st Stage 2
1965
 3rd Overall Vuelta a Colombia
1st Stage 13
1966
 1st Stage 7 Vuelta a Colombia
1968
 1st Stage 8 Vuelta a Colombia

References

1940 births
2010 deaths
Colombian male cyclists
People from Caldas Department
Olympic cyclists of Colombia
Cyclists at the 1960 Summer Olympics
Cyclists at the 1964 Summer Olympics
20th-century Colombian people